1. FCK is an abbreviation for the following German sports clubs:

 1. FC Kaiserslautern, a German association football club based in Kaiserslautern, Rhineland-Palatinate
 1. FC Köln, a German association football club based in Cologne, North Rhine-Westphalia